Verkhneye Pankratovo is a rural locality (a village) in Shemogodskoye Rural Settlement, Velikoustyugsky District, Vologda Oblast, Russia. The population was 7 as of 2002.

Geography 
Verkhneye Pankratovo is located 16 km east of Veliky Ustyug (the district's administrative centre) by road. Bolshiye Slobody is the nearest rural locality.

References 

Rural localities in Velikoustyugsky District